This article is a list of the prime ministers of Canada by their time in office. The list starts with Confederation on July 1, 1867, and the first prime minister, Sir John A. Macdonald.  It includes all prime ministers since then, up to the current prime minister, nor do they have term limits.  Instead, they can stay in office as long as their government has the confidence of a majority in the House of Commons of Canada under the system of responsible government.  Under this system, Prime Minister Mackenzie King was Canada's longest-serving prime minister, holding office in three non-consecutive terms for a total of twenty-one years and one hundred fifty-four days.

The prime minister's term begins upon appointment by the Governor General of Canada, usually after winning a general election, but sometimes after succeeding an outgoing prime minister of the same party. A prime minister stays in office until they resign, die or are dismissed by the Governor General.  Two prime ministers have died in office (Macdonald and Sir John Thompson).  All others have resigned, either after losing an election or upon retirement.  Theoretically, the Governor General can dismiss a prime minister, but that has never happened.

The prime ministerial term is not tied directly to the term of the House of Commons, which the Constitution sets as a maximum of five years from the most recent general election.  A prime minister takes office after winning an election, and resigns after losing an election, but the term in office does not match up directly to the term of the Parliament.  An incoming prime minister will normally take office a few weeks after the election, and an outgoing prime minister will usually stay in office for a few weeks after losing the election.  The transition period and the date for the transfer of office are negotiated by the incoming and the outgoing prime ministers.

A prime minister who holds office in consecutive parliaments is not re-appointed as prime minister for each parliament, but rather serves one continuous term.  When a prime minister holds office in more than one parliament, it is customarily referred to as the prime minister's first government, second government, and so on.

A majority government normally lasts around four years, since general elections for Parliament are normally held every four years. Minority governments generally last for a shorter period. The shortest minority government, Prime Minister Meighen's second government, lasted just under three months.  A prime minister who is selected by the governing party to replace an outgoing prime minister may also serve a short term, if the new prime minister is defeated at the general election.  Prime Minister Tupper served the shortest term in Canadian history, only sixty-eight days, in this way.  He was selected by the Conservative Party to replace Prime Minister Bowell just before the general election of 1896, which Tupper and the Conservatives lost.  Prime Ministers John Turner and Kim Campbell both served short terms for similar reasons.

Of the other prime ministers who served short terms, Arthur Meighen, Joe Clark, and Paul Martin had their time in office cut short by the collapse of their minority governments and the subsequent election of the opposition party.

In the late nineteenth century, three prime ministers succeeded to the office and did not call an election: Prime Minister Abbott resigned for health reasons and Prime Minister Thompson died in office.  Prime Minister Bowell resigned after a Cabinet revolt.

On six occasions from the twentieth century, a prime minister has retired and the governing party has selected a new party leader, who automatically became prime minister.  Arthur Meighen (1920), Louis St. Laurent (1948), Pierre Trudeau (1968), John Turner (1984), Kim Campbell (1993) and Paul Martin (2003) all succeeded to the office in this way.  The new prime minister may continue to govern in the parliament called by the previous prime minister, but normally calls an election within a few months.  (Prime Minister Meighen was the exception, governing for over a year before calling an election.)  In those cases, the time before and after the election is counted as one government for the purposes of this table.

When a general election is called, the current prime minister stays in office during the election campaign.  If the prime minister's party wins the election, the prime minister remains in office without being sworn in again;  the prime minister's tenure of office is continuous. If defeated in the election, the outgoing prime minister stays in office during the transition period, until the new prime minister takes office.  All of that time is included in the total "Time in office". The first day of a prime minister's term is counted in the total, but the last day is not.

For the first half century of Confederation, there were gaps between the term of an outgoing prime minister and the incoming prime minister.  The shortest gap, two days, was between Macdonald and Alexander Mackenzie in 1873:  Macdonald resigned office on November 5, 1873, and Mackenzie was appointed on November 7.  The longest gap, ten days, was upon the death of Macdonald on June 6, 1891.  Prime Minister Abbott did not take office until June 16, 1891. The last time there was a gap, of four days, occurred between Laurier and Robert Borden:  Laurier resigned effective October 6, 1911, and Borden took office on October 10.  There have been no gaps in office since that transition, with the new prime minister taking office the day after the former prime minister leaves office.

Table of prime ministers 
Canadian custom is to count by the individuals who were prime minister, not by terms. Since Confederation, 23 prime ministers have been "called upon" by the governor general to form 29 Canadian Ministries.
 (12)
 (10)
 (1)

Footnotes

See also

List of prime ministers of Canada
List of Canadian ministries
List of prime ministers of Australia by time in office
List of prime ministers of New Zealand by age
List of prime ministers of the United Kingdom by length of tenure

References

Bibliography 

 Forsey, Eugene A., How Canadians Govern Themselves (8th ed.), (Ottawa:  Library of Parliament, 2012).
 Hutchinson, Bruce, Mr Prime Minister 1867–1964 (Don Mills:  Longmans Canada Ltd., 1964).

External links 

 Library and Archives Canada: First Among Equals:  The Prime Minister in Canadian Life and Politics.

Canada, Prime Ministers
Time in office